Joce is a surname. Notable people with the surname include:

Robert Joce, British slalom canoeist
John Joce (disambiguation), multiple people